Dmitry A. Pumpyansky (born 22 March 1964) is a Russian billionaire businessman. He was the owner and chairman of OAO TMK, a Russian global manufacturer of steel pipes for the oil and gas industry. As of August 2022, his net worth was estimated at US$2.0 billion.

Early life
Pumpyansky graduated from the Kirov Ural Polytechnic Institute in 1986, and earned a Candidate of Sciences (Engineering), and a Doctor of Science (Economics).

Career
Pumpyansky started as a metals trader, then ran several metal factories, then took over the Sinarsky Pipe Factory.

Pumpyansky joined OAO TMK in 2002. Together with fellow billionaires Sergei Popov and Andrey Melnichenko, they bought the company, and he bought them out in 2006, becoming the 100% owner. He was the chairman of TMK.

On March 9, 2022 TMK said in a statement that Pumpyansky is no longer a beneficiary of the Russian pipe manufacturer and has resigned from the company's board of directors.

Personal life
Pumpyansky is married, with one child. According to Forbes, he lives in Yekaterinburg, Russia. In 2022 Swissinfo reported that he, his wife, and Swiss son live in Geneva. He owned the 236-foot megayacht Axioma until it was auctioned off after it was seized in Gibraltar.

Sanctions 
Pumpyansky is on the list of 96 "oligarchs" in Countering America's Adversaries Through Sanctions Act, passed into US law in August 2017.

In March 2022, Pumpyansky was put on a list of sanctions by the European Union.

References

External link

Living people
Russian billionaires
1960s births
Russian individuals subject to European Union sanctions